Kattipudi is a village in the East Godavari district of Andhra Pradesh State, India.

Geography

Kattipudi is the origin of National Highway NH 216.

References

Villages in East Godavari district
Road junctions in India